Konguta Parish was a rural municipality in Tartu County, Estonia.

Settlements

Twinnings
 Kinnula Municipality, Finland

References

External links

 

Populated places in Tartu County
Former municipalities of Estonia